SouthernUnderground is the second album from American rap trio CunninLynguists, released in 2003. As well as resident vocalist Deacon the Villain and DJ/vocalist Kno, the group employed Mr. SOS to accompany on vocals for much of the album. In addition to these three, other artists from the QN5 record label appear, including Tonedeff.

It is best known for its single "Seasons", featuring Masta Ace, that details that history of hip hop comparing different eras to seasons of a year.  It also has some political songs, such as "Dying Nation," "War," and "Appreciation," which takes a somber, storytelling approach to the September 11th attacks.

It also includes the song "Falling Down", which is based on Falling Down, a film about a man violently making his way across Los Angeles.

Track listing

 "Intro" – 0:59
 "Southernunderground" – 2:39
 "The South" – 3:29
 "Love Ain't" (featuring Tonedeff) – 4:00
 "Rain" – 3:16
 "Doin Alright" – 4:40
 "Interlude 1" – 1:25
 "Old School" – 3:54
 "Seasons" (featuring Masta Ace) – 3:36
 "Nasty Filthy" (featuring Supastition and Cashmere the Pro) – 4:47
 "Falling Down" – 6:34
 "Sunrise/Sunset" – 3:39
 "Interlude 2" – 1:30
 "Appreciation" (remix) (featuring Cashmere the Pro) – 3:27
 "Dying Nation" – 3:38
 "War" – 6:59

Credits

Production 
 Kno – track 1, 3–8, 10, 11, 13–16
 Domingo – track 2
 RJD2 – track 9
 Freshchest Prose – track 12

References

2003 albums
CunninLynguists albums
Albums produced by Domingo (producer)
Albums produced by RJD2